Duivenbode's bird-of-paradise is a bird in the family Paradisaeidae that is a hybrid between the emperor bird-of-paradise and lesser bird-of-paradise. The common name commemorates Maarten Dirk van Renesse van Duivenbode (1804–1878), Dutch trader of naturalia on Ternate.

History
It is known from a single adult male specimen held in the National Natural History Museum in Paris.  Its provenance is uncertain; it is said to come from an island in Geelvink Bay, western New Guinea, but was probably purchased as a trade skin there and is more likely to have derived ultimately from the Huon Peninsula of north-eastern New Guinea where the emperor bird of paradise is found.

Notes

References
 

Paradisaea
Hybrid birds of paradise
Birds of New Guinea